The Mount Holly Mausoleum was designed by architects Thompson and Harding in 1917 and is located in Little Rock, Arkansas.  Its architectural significance lies in its austerity of simple Greek Revival design.   The structure was added to the National Register of Historic Places in 1982.  The mausoleum is located in the northwest corner of Little Rock's oldest and most picturesque cemetery, Mount Holly (which is also listed in the National Register of Historic Places).

Constructed of limestone, the building is composed of a central entrance block flanked by two smaller wings.  The entrance is framed by two fluted Doric columns which have been set back into the structure and are flush with the outside wall.  A simple cornice with cavetto molding wraps the entire central block; the simple parapet rises slightly higher over the entrance.  The entrance features two double doors with multi paned leaded glass cames (grooved strips that hold together the panes) embellished with a laurel wreath motif in stained glass. Additionally, stained glass windows with predominant tones of gold, green, and lavender appear flanking the door and in the transom as well as at the rear of the main block.

See also
 Linwood Mausoleum: NRHP listing in Paragould, Arkansas
 National Register of Historic Places listings in Little Rock, Arkansas

References

Buildings and structures completed in 1917
Greek Revival architecture in Arkansas
Neoclassical architecture in Arkansas
National Register of Historic Places in Little Rock, Arkansas
Individually listed contributing properties to historic districts on the National Register in Arkansas
Mausoleums on the National Register of Historic Places
Monuments and memorials on the National Register of Historic Places in Arkansas
1917 establishments in Arkansas
Death in Arkansas